Bill Armstrong is a New York based fine art photographer who is known for his blurred color photographs. He grew up in Concord, Massachusetts.

Life and career 

Bill Armstrong is a New York based fine art photographer who has been shooting in color for over thirty years. His Mandala series was featured in a two-person exhibition at the Philadelphia Museum of Art in 2008, and he had a mid career retrospective at the Southeast Museum of Photography in Daytona Beach in 2010. Armstrong’s work is in many museum collections including the Victoria & Albert Museum, Philadelphia Museum of Art, Brooklyn Museum, Houston Museum of Fine Arts, Santa Barbara Museum of Art, and the Bibliothèque nationale de France. He has presented work in numerous museum exhibitions including: the Smithsonian Institution; Hayward Gallery, London; Musee de l’Elysee, Lausanne; Centro Internazionale di Fotografia, Milan; and FOAM, Amsterdam.
One of Armstrong’s images was chosen for the cover of Lyle Rexer’s Aperture book, The Edge of Vision: The Rise of Abstraction in Photography. His work appears in Face: The New Photographic Portrait by William Ewing and Exploring Color Photography, by Robert Hirsch, among other books. He has also been published in numerous periodicals including The New Yorker, The New York Times, Harper’s, House and Garden and Eyemazing.

He is on the faculty at the International Center of Photography and the School of Visual Arts.

References

External links 
www.billarmstrongphotography.com

Year of birth missing (living people)
Living people
Photographers from New York (state)
Fine art photographers